FC Moldova Boroseni was a Moldovan football club based in Borosenii Noi, Moldova. Founded in 1991, the club played 3 seasons in the Moldovan National Division, the top division in Moldovan football. It was dissolved in 1994.

Achievements
Moldovan National Division
 Third Place (1): 1992–93

List of seasons

References

External links
 FC Moldova Boroseni at WeltFussballArchive 

Defunct football clubs in Moldova
Association football clubs established in 1991
Association football clubs disestablished in 1994
1991 establishments in Moldova
1994 disestablishments in Moldova